Taowhywee Point is a summit in the U.S. state of Oregon.

Taowhywee is a name derived from the Takelma language meaning "morning star". It was the Indian name of Margaret Tao-Why-Wee Harney (1807-1893), a medicine woman of the Confederated Tribes of Siletz.

References

Mountains of Jackson County, Oregon
Mountains of Oregon